Robert Hague (born 1967, Rotorua, NZ), is an Australian artist living and working in Melbourne, Victoria. He is best known for his metal and marble sculpture and his detailed lithographic print work.

Biography
Hague migrated to Australia in 1985 and at first exhibited painting (Rotorua Art Prize, Caulfield Art Prize) before concentrating on sculpture.<ref>Tim Olsen Gallery, Sydney</ref> His first sculpture exhibition was titled "Why Not?" at Tap Gallery in Sydney, which included the artists James Powditch and  Mark Booth, among others. In 1998 he exhibited at the fledgling Sculpture by the Sea and in 1999 was awarded the inaugural Sculpture by the Sea, Director’s Prize. From 1996 - 2000 he exhibited at Defiance Gallery including the Miniature shows "The Defiant 6"", "Big Thoughts, Small Works" and "The Importance of being Tiny" with King St Gallery. In 2001 he joined Stella Downer Fine Art at the newly opened Danks Street Gallery Complex.

From 1999 to 2003 he was workshop assistant to senior sculptor Ron Robertson-Swann OAM (formally assistant to sculptor Henry Moore (1898-1986)), with his first solo exhibitions in 2003 at Lister Calder Gallery, Stella Downer Fine Art and the Mosman Art Gallery. He has since exhibited in more than 120 group and solo shows and is represented in both public and corporate collections in Australia and overseas.

In 2013 a ten-year retrospective of his work was held by Deakin University Gallery in Melbourne, including the publication 'Deca' with essays by Ashley Crawford and Ken Scarlett. In 2014 a biographical film was produced by  Peter Lamont called Uncertain Ciphers and includes interviews with the art critics Andrew Frost, Ken Scarlett and art dealer Lisa Fehily.

More recently, Hague was shortlisted for the 2015 Wynne prize at the Art Gallery of NSW, and the 2016 Blake Prize at the Casula Powerhouse, winning the Established Artist Residency. In 2016 the marble sculpture Shutdown was acquired by the National Gallery of Victoria from the exhibition 'Inaugural' at Nicholas Projects.

Lithography
In 2012 Hague began a series of lithographic prints with master printmaker Peter Lancaster at his Melbourne print studios, Lancaster Press. These have been included in the National Works on Paper at MPRG, the Geelong and Bernie Print Prizes and in 2016 the complete 'plate series' was acquired by the National Gallery of Australia.

Commissions
Significant commissions include Stride Orbis (2013) a 65 tonne concrete sculpture for Form700 head offices, Melbourne. Sol, Repose, One Mile and Skel (2010) for the  Polo Club Hotel, Tianjin, China. West Orbis (2009) 4m sculpture for Chadstone Shopping Centre. Decent (2007) for the 50th Anniversary, Thredbo, Mt Kosciusko. Genus (2005) Macquarie Group Sovereign Centre foyer, 99 Bathurst St, Sydney. Fervor (2005) Four Seasons Hotel foyer, Hong Kong. Orbis (2005) Emporio Apartments foyer, Sussex St, Sydney. NSW and The Ocean Series (2001) 20 sculpture, patron commission for Sculpture by the Sea, Sydney.

Awards
2016: The Blake Prize, Established Artist Residency, Sydney
2011: Lorne Sculpture 2011 small sculpture Award Lorne, Vic
2010: Deakin University contemporary small sculpture award, Melbourne.
2009: Yarra Trams Award, Toorak Sculpture Prize. Melbourne.
2000: Waverley Art Prize, Sculpture. Sydney.
1999: The Director's Prize, Sculpture by the Sea, Sydney Sydney.

Collections

Gallery - Timeline

References

 Plowman, John. The Sculptor's Bible. (2005) Quarto Publishing Plc. 
 Sculpture by the Sea 1997-2011. (2011) Media 21 Publishing. 
 Sculpture by the Sea, print catalogues: Bondi :, 1998, 1999, 2000, 2001, 2002, 2003, 2006, 2008, 2011. Cottesloe : 2005, 2006, 2011.
 World Sculpture News. 'Deakin Sculpture Award'. Winter 2011
 The Sun Herald, Life Magazine. 'Q&A', Chris Sheedy. 5/11/06
 The Australian Art Market Report. Issue 6. 12/02

External links
 Artist's website

Australian artists
Living people
1967 births
People from Rotorua
New Zealand emigrants to Australia
20th-century New Zealand sculptors
20th-century New Zealand male artists
20th-century Australian sculptors
21st-century Australian sculptors